Jamel Curtis Holley (born September 13, 1979) is an American Democratic Party politician from the state of New Jersey, who served in the New Jersey General Assembly representing the 20th Legislative District from 2015 to 2022. He is the first African American to represent the district, serving out the unexpired term of former Assemblyman and now State Senator Joseph Cryan, and formerly served as councilman and then mayor of Roselle, New Jersey; at age 32, he was the borough's youngest-ever mayor. In 2021, Holley unsuccessfully challenged Cryan in the June 2021 New Jersey State Senate primary, losing by 29 points.

Early life
Holley graduated from Abraham Clark High School in Roselle in 1997, received a Bachelor of Science in Criminal Justice from New Jersey City University in 2002, and earned a Master of Public Administration from Kean University in 2006.  In 2001, he was appointed as Chief of Staff to Neil M. Cohen of New Jersey's 20th Legislative District, the youngest Chief of Staff for any of New Jersey's 120 legislators.

He works for Irvington Township as the Director of Public Works under Mayor Tony Vauss.

Political career
On November 2, 2004, Holley won the General Election for Councilman at Large in the Borough of Roselle, becoming Union County's youngest Councilman at age 25. Commissioned by the New Jersey Democratic State Committee to serve as a committee member at the 2004 Democratic National Convention, he won re-election to his at-large seat following year.  He made history by officiating the first gay wedding in New Jersey "forever cementing himself into the annals of queer liberation."

Elections

Mayor of Roselle
Holley was elected Mayor of the Borough of Roselle in November 2011, becoming Roselle's youngest mayor in its 117-year history.  He ran unopposed for mayor after defeating two-term Mayor Garrett Smith in the Borough's Democratic primaries in June,  despite Smith having the support of U.S. Congressman Donald M. Payne of New Jersey's 10th District.  Holley's running mates were then-Councilman-elect Randy Sandifer and then-Councilman Yves. F. Aubourg, Mayor Holley began his term on January 1, 2012 and was officially inaugurated on January 6, at age 32. He joined nearly 50 other Union County Democrats to endorse Newark Mayor Cory Booker for his bid for the U.S. Senate in 2013, and supported Raymond Lesniak's successful bid for senate reelection in New Jersey's 20th District.

After the acquittal of George Zimmerman in the Trayvon Martin murder trial, Mayor Holley and Roselle's Borough Council submitted a formal plea to President Barack Obama and U.S. Attorney General Eric Holder to investigate alleged violations of civil rights relating to the 2012 fatal shooting. Roselle was the first Union County municipality to appeal to the Obama administration for further examination of the case after Zimmerman was found not guilty of second-degree murder and manslaughter charges.

New Jersey Assembly 
Holley was unanimously chosen by Democratic committee members of the 20th district to fill the Assembly seat of Joseph Cryan, who resigned in 2015 to become the Union County Sheriff. He has since won two additional two-year terms in the Assembly, serving with Democratic running mate Annette Quijano.

Committees 
Homeland Security and State Preparedness
Health and Senior Services

2021 New Jersey State Senate election

Holley announced in January 2021 that he would challenge Joseph Cryan in the June 8, 2021 primary for New Jersey State Senate.  He lost the primary to Cryan by a wide margin.

Controversies 
In 2009, Holley was charged with tampering with ballots in a primary election contest, a third-degree crime which carries a maximum sentence of five years in prison.  The charge was the result of an investigation by the Official Corruption Bureau of the New Jersey State Police.  Holley waived his right to indictment by a grand jury and agreed to be charged by accusation to filling out 30 absentee ballots.  After several power brokers denounced the attorney general's office for charging Holley, a judge allowed Holley to enter a pre-trial intervention program to avoid jail time over the attorney general's objections.  At the time, the governor's office backed the attorney general and commented, "any elected official charged with public corruption should step down because they can’t effectively serve the public under the cloud of the charges." In 2016, Roselle Mayor Christine Dansereau, Holley's successor, accused him of harassment and intimidation in a police report. Dansereau announced her resignation due to health reasons in June 2020. Holley was quoted saying, "I wish her well as she moves on."

Opposition to vaccines 
Holley supports the anti-vaccination movement, contrary to the scientific consensus that vaccines are safe and effective. In February 2020, at a rally of anti-vaccine activists at the Connecticut State Capitol in opposition to a bill narrowing vaccine exemptions, Holley spoke in support of the anti-vaccination movement alongside attorney Robert F. Kennedy Jr.; he had whipped against a similar bill in New Jersey in early 2020, which passed the Assembly but later stalled in the Senate. Kennedy, an anti-vaccine activist, has raised hundreds of thousands of dollars for Holley through fundraising speeches, and delivered remarks to Holley and other members of the NJ Legislative Black Caucus in January on "the harmful effects of vaccinations."

Holley maintains an active social media presence and has directed accusatory tweets at Bill Gates, saying he "...injected and caused harm to mulitple [sic] minority families in India and Africa.". Gates' charity has donated billions to efforts to eradicate AIDS, polio, tuberculosis, malaria and other diseases through vaccines and other programs.

Electoral history

New Jersey Assembly

References

External links
 Jamel C. Holley (D)  - New Jersey Legislature Biography

1979 births
Living people
Abraham Clark High School alumni
African-American state legislators in New Jersey
Kean University alumni
Mayors of places in New Jersey
New Jersey city council members
New Jersey City University alumni
People from Roselle, New Jersey
Democratic Party members of the New Jersey General Assembly
21st-century American politicians
Politicians from Union County, New Jersey
American anti-vaccination activists
21st-century African-American politicians
20th-century African-American people
Place of birth missing (living people)